Walking After Midnight is a 1988 Canadian documentary film directed by Jonathan Kay. It screened in the Perspectives Canada section of the Toronto Festival of Festivals in late 1988. The film features celebrities from film and music, as well as the Dalai Lama, discussing reincarnation and speculating on their past lives. Narrated by Ringo Starr, it includes appearances by Martin Sheen, James Coburn, k.d. lang, Willie Nelson, Donovan, Catherine Oxenberg, Rae Dawn Chong and Helen Shaver.

The stories are supported by musical accompaniment and partly told through re-enactments. Sheen recalls a near-death experience he had while filming Apocalypse Now in the 1970s, and Lang asserts that in a past life she was country singer Patsy Cline.

References

External links 

1988 documentary films
1988 films
Canadian documentary films
Films about reincarnation
1980s Canadian films